Fiesta San Antonio (or simply "Fiesta") is an annual festival held in April in San Antonio, Texas, and is the city's signature event (along with some events held in the following surrounding cities: Boerne, Schertz, Windcrest, Balcones Heights, and Alamo Heights) since 1891. The festival, also known as the Battle of Flowers, commemorates of the Battle of the Alamo, which took place in San Antonio, and the Battle of San Jacinto, which led to Texas' independence from Mexico in April 1836.

Fiesta is the city's biggest festival, with an economic impact of $340 million for the city. More than three million people take part, in more than 100 events that take place all over the city and beyond.

History
The festival began in 1891, when local women decorated carriages, baby buggies and bicycles with live flowers, met in front of the Alamo, and threw flowers at one another, thus inspiring the name "Battle of Flowers." Soon, other activities were added to the flower parade, including balls, parties and a carnival. The celebration's name changed over the years from Carnival to Spring Carnival to Fiesta San Jacinto and, in 1960, to Fiesta San Antonio.

The Battle of Flowers Parade Association began crowning a Carnival Queen in 1895. In 1909, local businessman John Carrington established The Order of the Alamo with the purpose of crowning a queen, a princess and 24 duchesses — 12 from San Antonio and 12 from out of town. Coronations of local "royalty", a carnival and other activities became the forerunners of today's fiesta.
In 2016, Fiesta celebrated its 125th birthday with special events and ceremony.

Events
Today, more than 100 local nonprofit groups, members of the Fiesta San Antonio Commission, stage more than 100 events over 17 days with the help of some 75,000 volunteers.

Fiesta events include three major parades—two along Broadway and past the Alamo, and a boat parade at the San Antonio River Walk (where the "floats" actually float).

Louisiana cuisine is sold at "A Taste of New Orleans" in Brackenridge Park, and oysters and other foods are offered at St. Mary's University's Fiesta Oyster Bake. There are music (six performance stages) and cultural events, lasting two days.

A Night in Old San Antonio (NIOSA) is a four-evening block party at La Villita downtown.

Fiesta in Blue is another annual event, featuring the USAF Band of the West.  Two evenings of concerts are put on in downtown San Antonio featuring classical, jazz, and rock/popular music.

Music offered includes Tejano, jazz, mariachi, rock, big band, classical, and pop. History events are held at the Pilgrimage to the Alamo or This Hallowed Ground. Sporting events include races, soccer, rugby, and lacrosse. Cornyation is a satirical musical review for adults only.

Residents and visitors can get souvenir pins and medals from various dignitaries or from members of the Fiesta royalty.

Battle of Flowers and Fiesta Flambeau parades
The Battle of Flowers Parade is the oldest Fiesta event and is organized entirely by women. The parade attracts crowds of more than 350,000 on the second Friday of Fiesta. It is the only parade in the U.S. produced entirely by women, all of whom are volunteers. The women, dressed in yellow on parade day and wearing yellow hats, direct operations with the assistance of the Army National Guard. Several school districts within San Antonio treat the day of the Battle of Flowers as a local holiday and consequently don't hold classes.

The Fiesta Flambeau Parade starts at sunset on the second Saturday of the festival. Dating from 1948, the parade is illuminated by thousands of lights on the dancers, the band instruments, the horses, the cars, and the floats. An estimated crowd of 600,000 filled the parade route in 2011 to watch the Fiesta Flambeau Parade.

Oversight
Overseeing the festival is a single nonprofit organization, the Fiesta San Antonio Commission.  The sponsoring organizations must meet the commission's criteria before receiving approval and being invited to join.

The commission is governed by an all-volunteer board of community leaders and representatives from its nonprofit participating member organizations. The group works throughout the year, coordinating the details and day-to-day tasks required to plan the citywide event. The commission also serves as a liaison between its nonprofit members, the local military activities, and the City of San Antonio. City services are essential to the conduct of Fiesta.

The commission receives no government funding. Its income comes from corporate partnerships, sales in the Fiesta Store, membership dues, and proceeds from the Fiesta Carnival.

Future Fiesta dates
April 20–30, 2023,
April 18–28, 2024,
April 24-May 4, 2025,
April 16–26, 2026,
April 15–25, 2027,
April 20–30, 2028.

References

External links

Fiesta San Antonio
Guide to the Fiesta San Antonio Commission Records, University of Texas at San Antonio Libraries (UTSA Libraries) Special Collections.

Parades in the United States
History of San Antonio
Festivals in San Antonio
Tourist attractions in San Antonio
Flower festivals in the United States